Raymond "Ray" King (born 1964) is an American entrepreneur and co-founder of multiple companies including AboutUs.org and Top Level Design.

Early life, education and career
King was born in 1964 to Kenneth, an architect, and Yien-Koo. He graduated from The Bronx High School of Science in June 1982. He began his career in technology as a teenager establishing The Computer Workshop, with 17 of his friends, which offered computing classes at his apartment and Manhattan's Grand Central Terminal. In an interview with The New York Times, King said:

The venture, which taught people how to use Apple II and IBM PCs, earned King $60,000. He later recalled: "We approached people at Grand Central Station and convinced them to come take our courses. We were written up in The New York Times. I made enough money to pay for one year of college at MIT." King remained enrolled at the Massachusetts Institute of Technology for eighteen months studying computer science before leaving in 1984 to start Semaphore Inc., a company that sold accounting, billing, and project management software to architecture and engineering firms. The company received $4 million in invested capital and grew to 100 employees in four offices by the time it was sold to Virginia-based DelTek Inc. in 2000 for nearly $12 million.

After relocating to Portland, Oregon to live in a city where he could bike to work, and enjoy a higher quality of living, he founded the secondary market domain name company SnapNames in 2000. The company specialized in "snapping up" expired domain names, which occurred "all the time", according to King. It took in $7.8 million in invested capital and partnered with several of the largest domain name registrars. King was appointed chief operating officer in 2001. He left SnapNames in 2005 to start his next business venture, AboutUs. By 2006, SnapNames was generating gross sales of $49 million. The company sold to California-based Oversee.net in 2007 for $30 million.

King founded AboutUs.org, a wiki Internet domain directory, in 2006. In November 2006, the company closed its initial financing round for one million dollars. In January 2009, AboutUs secured a $5 million Series A funding round from Voyager Capital, Capybara Ventures, Northwest Technology Ventures and private individuals, including angel investors Tom Holce and Irving Levin. Within three years, AboutUs employed 34 people in Portland and Lahore, Pakistan. King served as chief executive officer until he stepped down in 2013.

In 2012, King co-founded Top Level Design, a domain name registry for multiple generic top-level domains, with his brother-in-law and investor Peter Brual. The registry has managed the .design, .gay, .ink, and .wiki top-level domains.

Personal life and recognition
King and his wife Deneen have one daughter named Dakota and collect minimalist art. In 2000, the New York Post profiled their five-level townhouse in the West Village valued at $7.75 million. In 2009, he received the Oregon Entrepreneurs Network's annual award for individual achievement.

Works

Further reading

See also
 List of Bronx High School of Science alumni
 List of Massachusetts Institute of Technology alumni

References

1964 births
Living people
20th-century American businesspeople
21st-century American businesspeople
American art collectors
American chief operating officers
American company founders
American computer businesspeople
American technology chief executives
Businesspeople from New York City
Businesspeople from Portland, Oregon
MIT School of Engineering alumni
People from Greenwich Village
The Bronx High School of Science alumni